Nazneen Patel is an Indian actress who appeared in Bollywood movies and Indian soap operas.

Career
Patel made her debut with Indian soap opera, Main Aisi Kyunn Hoon in 2007. She made her Bollywood debut with the movie Good Luck!.

Filmography

Films

Television

See also
Cinema of India
Bollywood

References

External links
 

Indian television actresses
Living people
Actresses from Mumbai
Actresses in Hindi cinema
Actresses in Hindi television
21st-century Indian actresses
Indian film actresses
Year of birth missing (living people)